Ruhollah (also Romanized as Rūḩollāh) is a village in Poshtdarband Rural District, in the Central District of Kermanshah County, Kermanshah Province, Iran. At the 2006 census, its population was 38, in 8 families.

References 

Populated places in Kermanshah County